Kwame Afriyie Adubofour Poku (born 11 August 2001) is a professional footballer who plays as a midfielder for EFL Championship side Peterborough United. Born in England, he represents Ghana internationally.

Club career
Born in Croydon, Poku joined Worthing from Cray Wanderers in February 2019. With Cray Wanderers, he made one senior appearance in the Kent Senior Cup and scored twice in twelve appearances in the 2018–19 Isthmian League for Worthing. In May 2019, following a successful trial, he signed for Colchester United.

On 3 September 2019, Poku made his professional debut for Colchester in a 3–2 EFL Trophy win against Gillingham. He scored his first professional goal on 21 September 2019 in Colchester's 2–1 victory against Leyton Orient.

On 5 December 2019, Poku signed a new two-and-a-half year deal with Colchester to keep him with the Essex club until summer 2022.

On 2 August 2021, he signed a four-year contract with Peterborough United.
On 1 October 2022, Poku scored his first Peterborough goal in a 3-2 win against Milton Keynes Dons.

International career
Born in England, Poku is of Ghanaian descent.

On 19 March 2021, Poku was called up to the Ghana national football team for the first time for their 2021 Africa Cup of Nations qualifying games against South Africa and São Tomé and Príncipe. He made his debut on 28 March 2021 after coming on as a 79th-minute substitute for Mohammed Kudus in a 3–1 victory over São Tomé and Príncipe at the Accra Sports Stadium.

Career statistics

Club

International

References

2001 births
Living people
Association football midfielders
English footballers
Citizens of Ghana through descent
Ghanaian footballers
English people of Ghanaian descent
Ghanaian people of English descent
Cray Wanderers F.C. players
Worthing F.C. players
Colchester United F.C. players
Isthmian League players
English Football League players
Black British sportspeople
Footballers from Croydon
Ghana international footballers
Peterborough United F.C. players